25I-NB4OMe (2C-I-NB4OMe, NB4OMe-2C-I) is a derivative of the phenethylamine hallucinogen 2C-I, which acts as a highly potent partial agonist for the human 5-HT2A receptor.

Legality

United Kingdom

References 

2C (psychedelics)
Designer drugs